Alika is a monotypic moth genus of the family Noctuidae. Its only species, Alika typica, is found in Taiwan. Both the genus and species were first described by Strand in 1920.

References

Acronictinae
Noctuoidea genera
Monotypic moth genera